Gari Sheykh (also Romanized as Garī Sheykh and Gerī Sheykh; also known as Goor Sheikh and Gūrī Sheykh) is a village in Khamir Rural District, in the Central District of Khamir County, Hormozgan Province, Iran. At the 2006 census, its population was 432, in 98 families.

References 

Populated places in Khamir County